The Daniel Guggenheim Medal is an American engineering award, established by Daniel and Harry Guggenheim. The medal is considered to be one of the greatest honors that can be presented for a lifetime of work in aeronautics.  Its first recipient was Orville Wright. Other recipients have included American and international individuals from aeronautical corporations, governments, and academia.

Since 1929 it has been given annually to persons who make notable achievements in the advancement of aeronautics. It is awarded jointly by the American Society of Mechanical Engineers, the Society of Automotive Engineers, the American Helicopter Society, and the American Institute of Aeronautics and Astronautics.  The American Institute of Aeronautics and Astronautics administers the award.

Physical Description 
Obverse: Spirit of St. Louis, a hot air balloon, and the nose of airship over sun burst and clouds depicted in relief; raised text on outer ring surrounding relief.

Reverse: Three stylized bird wings surrounding raised letters and inscribed text.

Dimensions (diameter x depth): 6.4 × 0.5cm (2 1/2 × 3/16 in.)

Recipients
The winners are listed below along with their award citation and year.

See also

 List of aviation awards
 List of engineering awards
 Wright Brothers Medal
 Wright Brothers Memorial Trophy

References

External links
  The Daniel Guggenheim Medal - aiaa.org/guggenheim

Aviation awards
Aerospace engineering awards
Awards established in 1929
1929 establishments in the United States